James Henry Bowman, MBE, JP (died 6 November 1940) was a local politician from the English county of Lincolnshire who served as Vice-Chairman of Kesteven County Council.

Life 
James Henry Bowman was the third son of Edward Bowman. He was a member of the building and contractors company Messrs. Bowman and Sons. Bowman was elected to Stamford Town Council in 1911 and elevated to Alderman in 1926. He was a long-serving chairman of the Town Council's Finance Committee and was mayor of Stamford in 1926, 1927 and 1928.

Bowman was also elected to Kesteven County Council in 1917 and was made an alderman in 1931. In 1937, he was appointed its Vice-Chairman and served until his death. He was also chairman of its Education Committee and in 1938 was President of the East Midlands Educational Union.

During the General Strike of 1926, Bowman was a food officer and in World War I, he was a distribution officer for the Ministry of Food and a director of transport for the North Midland Division; he was appointed a Member of the Order of the British Empire in recognition of this service. In 1926 he was also appointed a justice of the peace for Kesteven and three years later was made a magistrate for Stamford. He was a Liberal and chaired the Rutland and Stamford Divisional Liberal Association. Bowman died on 6 November 1940, aged 66.

References

1940 deaths
English justices of the peace
Members of the Order of the British Empire
People from Stamford, Lincolnshire
Councillors in Lincolnshire
Mayors of places in Lincolnshire
Members of Kesteven County Council
1870s births